Fightin' Fools is a 1941 Our Gang short comedy film directed by Edward Cahn. It was the 195th Our Gang short (196th episode, 107th talking short, 108th talking episode, and 27th MGM produced episode) that was released.

Plot
The gang is swimming in their favorite swimming hole, except for Tubby, who is scared to jump in. He finally does and his great weight and size causes all the water to splash out of the swimming hole, leaving the gang dry.

Meanwhile, bully Slicker and his friends tie knots in the Gang's clothes and when the gang finds them, a total war is declared. Commandeered by Spanky, Buckwheat, and Tubby, the gang staves off Slicker's "troops" with a barrage of fruit, vegetables, rotten eggs and Limburger cheese. For a while, it looks as though Slicker has gained the upper hand, but the gang successfully mounts an aerial counteroffensive.

Notes
Though this film is not generally rated highly, it does have a few aspects that set it apart from other Our Gang films of the era. The cast is entirely made up of children, one of very few such instances at M-G-M. It is also one of the few Our Gang shorts since the mid-1930s to be filmed almost entirely outdoors. Finally there is a strong emphasis on sight gags, though they occur at a relatively low density compared to earlier films. Nonetheless these things taken together make this perhaps the closest the M-G-M era ever came to the feel of the McGowan era Our Gang. There is evidence within the film that this may be a conscious effort. The war takes place on "McGowan's Lot."
Might be a remake or a nod to the previous Our Gang Little Rascals 1923 silent short Dogs of War.

Cast

The Gang
 Mickey Gubitosi as Mickey
 Billy Laughlin as Froggy
 George McFarland as Spanky
 Billie Thomas as Buckwheat
 Leonard Landy as Leonard
 Joe Strauch, Jr. as Tubby

Additional cast
 Freddie Walburn as Slicker
 Hugh "Dewey" Binyon as Member of Slicker's gang
 Vincent Graeff as Member of Slicker's gang
 Tommy Tobin as Member of Slicker's gang

See also
 Our Gang filmography

References

External links
 
 

1941 films
1941 comedy films
American black-and-white films
Films directed by Edward L. Cahn
Metro-Goldwyn-Mayer short films
Our Gang films
1941 short films
1940s American films